Thomas Henry (born 20 September 1994) is a French professional footballer who plays as a striker for Italian Serie A club Hellas Verona.

Club career

Early career
Henry began his career at Beauvais and Fréjus Saint-Raphaël before joining Nantes in 2015. He made his Ligue 1 debut on 12 December 2015 against Toulouse FC in a 1–1 draw replacing Alejandro Bedoya after 72 minutes.

Having made two appearances in Ligue 1 for Nantes he signed for Chambly on 15 June 2016.

OH Leuven
Henry joined OH Leuven in January 2019 after impressing with Tubize in the Belgian second division, scoring 11 goals in the first half of the 2018–19 season. He continued his good form with OH Leuven and scored a career-high 21 goals in the 2020–21 Belgian Pro League, second-most in the league. Following his good form throughout the 2020–21 season, Henry was linked with a number of clubs in Europe's top leagues including Celtic, Bordeaux, and Venezia. In total, Henry scored 45 goals and added 12 assists in 79 matches across all competitions with OH Leuven over three-and-a-half seasons before his transfer in August 2021.

Venezia
On 24 August 2021, newly promoted Serie A side Venezia announced that Henry had joined the club in a permanent deal. The move came after intense transfer speculation throughout the summer, including earlier reports stating that OH Leuven had accepted a bid of £7 million by Scottish Premiership club Celtic. He made his debut for the club three days later in a 3–0 defeat to Udinese. He scored his first goal for the club in their next match, a 2–1 league win over Empoli on 11 September.

Hellas Verona
On 16 July 2022, Henry moved to Hellas Verona on a four-year contract.

Career statistics

References

External links
 

1994 births
Living people
Association football forwards
French footballers
French expatriate footballers
AS Beauvais Oise players
ÉFC Fréjus Saint-Raphaël players
FC Nantes players
FC Chambly Oise players
A.F.C. Tubize players
Oud-Heverlee Leuven players
Venezia F.C. players
Hellas Verona F.C. players
Ligue 1 players
Championnat National players
Championnat National 2 players
Belgian Pro League players
Challenger Pro League players
Serie A players
Expatriate footballers in Belgium
French expatriate sportspeople in Belgium
Expatriate footballers in Italy
French expatriate sportspeople in Italy